Sigma Delta Rho was a small national men's fraternity founded on January 8, 1921 at Miami University of Ohio, the fifth general social fraternity to be formed at that school. It "disintegrated" in the spring of 1935 due to pressures of the Great Depression and "absence of strong leadership." About half its chapters were absorbed into other fraternities.

History
Sigma Delta Rho was founded at Miami University on  under the name of Delta Sigma Rho, and had received recognition from the university as a new local fraternity under that name. However, it was discovered that there was a previously existing national recognition (~honor) society of the same name, thus after several months, when plans were made for expansion into a national organization the chapter changed its own name, switching the order of the first two letters, to avoid confusion.

Incorporated then as Sigma Delta Rho under the laws of the State of Ohio, the chapter was the fifth social fraternity to be founded at Miami. Sigma Delta Rho honored five founders:
 Gilbert L. Stout
 Albert O. Grooms
 Aurthur Baker
 Herbert Ansteatt
 Roe Bush

Five of its eventual nine chapters were placed in Ohio.

Symbolism

Demise
According to Baird's, disagreement developed among its chapters as to the policies of the fraternity.

Fellow national fraternity Alpha Kappa Pi gained the chapters at Franklin and Marshall, Toledo, and Cincinnati.  This national later merged with Alpha Sigma Phi. The Illinois chapter banded together with a faltering chapter of Beta Psi to form a new chapter of Pi Kappa Phi. The Tri-State (Trine) chapter eventually joined Sigma Phi Epsilon. The others "gradually disappeared."

Chapters
Dates for disbanding are from collegiate yearbooks and from the Baird's Manual Archive Online. Active chapters that either merged into Alpha Kappa Pi, or withdrew to another successor organization at the time of dissolution are noted in bold, inactive chapters (dormant) or those that appear to have disbanded rather than merge are in italics.:

Notes

References

Defunct fraternities and sororities
Defunct former members of the North American Interfraternity Conference
Student organizations established in 1921
1921 establishments in Ohio
Alpha Sigma Phi
Miami University